Chevé Cave is a deep cave located in the Sierra Juárez mountain range in the southern Mexico state of Oaxaca. The main cave apparently ends in a terminal sump. 

, the present limit of exploration in Chevé, at 11.77 kilometers from the nearest entrance, represents one of the most remote locations ever attained inside any cave on Earth. The logistics of reaching this point are enormous: more than two kilometers of rope need to be rigged and seven underground camps established. Chevé is the deepest proven freshwater hydrological system in the world. It has been most thoroughly explored under the leadership of caver Bill Stone.

Exploration history
Chevé Cave was discovered in the mid-1980s by Bill Farr and Carol Vesely. As of 2015 the cave system had the greatest proven depth potential in the world as proven by a dye trace from its main entrance to the resurgence 2,547 meters lower. The terminus of the main Chevé system is a large breakdown pile reached after diving through two sumps. It is just over 9 kilometers from the entrance, making it one of the most remote underground locations on earth. Due to the logistical difficulties of continuing exploration from this point, expeditions are focusing on finding mid-way entrances that might provide a quicker route into the middle Chevé system.

On March 1, 1991, Indiana caver, Christopher Yeager, made a fatal mistake while rappelling the 23-meter drop in Chevé Cave. Eleven days after the accident, Yeager was buried in a passage near where he fell. On February 8, 1992, almost a year after his death, a team of Yeager’s caving friends used ropes and pulleys to pull his body to the surface which was returned to his family in Indiana.

In 2004, an international caving expedition led by the U.S. Deep Caving Team discovered a new cave they named J2. The entrance of J2 located 5 kilometers northeast of the Chevé Cave entrance. J2 appears to head in the direction of Chevé Cave, with a predicted intersection beyond the tunnel collapse that stopped the team in 2003.  Current expeditions are underway to find a connection between  J2 and Chevé Cave, which will produce a cave system more than 2 kilometers in depth. The integration of the entire system will produce a 2,597 meter deep cave and would represent the deepest cave in the world.

During the years 2017, 2018 and 2019 Chevé Cave reached 55 kilometers in length and a depth of 1,524 meters compared to the Palomitas cave entrance   

In 2021, an entire new section of the cave was discovered, increasing its known length to 76,735 meters and its depth to 1,536 meters.

The 2022 TV film "Explorer: the Deepest Cave" documents the further exploration of the cave in 2021 as it was taking place https://www.imdb.com/title/tt18225736/ and https://www.natgeotv.com/asia/explorer-the-deepest-cave

Archaeology 
Pre-Hispanic peoples used Chevé Cave for their ceremonial practices. In the Cuicatec region, most beliefs focus on a mystical figure called Señor del Cerro ("Lord of the Hill") who dwells in Chevé and cures souls is said to reside there. Numerous Cuicatec artifacts have been found within its passages. On January 24 and 25, 1988, the Chevé Archaeological Project (CAP) led by American archaeologist Janet Fitzsimmons in cooperation with archaeologists from the Instituto Nacional de Antropología e Historia (INAH) Oaxaca division, explored, recorded and mapped portions of the cave. They discovered impressive jade beads, a wooden mask, in situ vessels, buried human remains and obsidian blades, believed to have been used in bloodletting ceremonies. The greatest find of the survey was a turquoise mosaic tablet that was discovered in Chamber 1 of the cave, named the Cueva Chevé Tablet. The tablet dates to the Late Postclassic Period (1250–1500 AD). One quadrant pattern includes a battle scene with winners and losers. The cave was also likely used from the Classic Period (250–750 AD), and evidence that the cave continues to be used ceremonially today by the local Cuicatecs.
In the spring of 1990 and 1991, three archaeological chambers in the cave were excavated by a team of speleologists and archaeologists from the Instituto Nacional de Antropología e Historia (INAH). Chevé Cave quickly gained notoriety as the deepest cave in the Americas and foot traffic to the cave increased significantly. A decision was made to take the artifacts to the Oaxaca Regional Museum of INAH so they were not looted and to prevent further humidity damage.

See also 
Krubera Cave
List of Caves
List of caves in Mexico
List of deepest caves

References

External links
 https://web.archive.org/web/20150223022436/http://www.oaxaca-travel.com/guide/natural.php?getdoc=true&lang=us&doc=home&section=&atractivo=11.05.04.01
 http://nssmembersforum.proboards.com/index.cgi?board=Business&action=print&thread=12
 https://web.archive.org/web/20160304001603/https://books.nationalgeographic.com/ngm/caverace/week1/index.html
 https://web.archive.org/web/20150223034127/http://www.cancord.com/blog/to-hell-and-back-beyond-sump-4-to-the-core-of-the-sierra-juarez-part-1/
 http://articles.latimes.com/1992-11-01/news/mn-1695_1_cave-exploration
 https://web.archive.org/web/20150223024058/http://speleogenesis-info.isth.info/directory/karstbase/publication.php?id=8771
 http://montanismo.org/2003/sistema_cheve_la_caverna_mas_profunda_de_america/
 https://books.google.com/books?id=LpTIIZ_GpAC&pg=PA6&lpg=PA6&dq=sistema+Cheve&source=bl&ots=UQ4GqN1P2e&sig=b7cphwPyjN31sO_9h7G2dEeO_vc&hl=en&sa=X&ei=oFnRVLSJLIP7ggTznYHwBw&ved=0CDgQ6AEwBzgU#v=onepage&q=cheve&f=false
 https://web.archive.org/web/20150223003447/http://hennessyhammock.com/articles/scientific_explorations/
 http://philippelopes.free.fr/SistemaCheve.htm
 https://books.google.com/books?id=KDy2AgAAQBAJ&pg=PA32&lpg=PA32&dq=sistema+Cheve&source=bl&ots=RVsky8wozh&sig=HsBkRm1rAKshd4pHF4g_cQ2RFus&hl=en&sa=X&ei=A1vRVM7TMYOfgwSAq4PgAg&ved=0CB4Q6AEwATge#v=onepage&q=Cheve&f=false
 https://books.google.com/books?id=vPVJlRi91bwC&pg=PA4&lpg=PA4&dq=sistema+Cheve&source=bl&ots=0XgMDPA0V_&sig=zyWAlHf9UKo9DCLqeuOnvnVKkVw&hl=en&sa=X&ei=A1vRVM7TMYOfgwSAq4PgAg&ved=0CCgQ6AEwBDge#v=onepage&q=sistema%20Cheve&f=false
 https://books.google.com/books?id=MY0PAQAAQBAJ&pg=RA1-PA270&lpg=RA1-PA270&dq=sistema+Cheve&source=bl&ots=2FHSDMsKxG&sig=B7Qimo8i6ZrEuoGv2ytM0yo9Ex4&hl=en&sa=X&ei=A1vRVM7TMYOfgwSAq4PgAg&ved=0CCsQ6AEwBTge#v=onepage&q=sistema%20Cheve&f=false
 http://www.caverbob.com/wdeep.htm
 https://www.petzl.com/apex/Web_NewsDetail?animationId=a7Cw0000000PBj3EAG&l=gb&language=en&localCountryCode=US&tab=Community&universId=a3120000000HMf4AAG&userFriendlyUrl=%2Fen%2FSport%2FNews%2F2017-5-3%2FChris-Higgins-Explores-Cueva-Cheve-and-Nita-N-Tau&userFriendlyUrlOrig=%2FGB%2Fen%2FSport%2FNews%2F2017-5-3%2FChris-Higgins-Explores-Cueva-Cheve-and-Nita-N-Tau

Caves of Mexico
Landforms of Oaxaca
Limestone caves
Sierra Madre de Oaxaca
Karst formations of Mexico